Bart De Clercq (born 26 August 1986) is a Belgian former professional road bicycle racer, who rode professionally between 2011 and 2019 for the  and  teams. His first professional victory was the seventh stage of the 2011 Giro d'Italia.

Major results

2009
 4th Circuit de Wallonie
 5th Overall Grand Prix Guillaume Tell
2010
 5th Overall Giro della Valle d'Aosta
2011
 1st Stage 7 Giro d'Italia
2013
 5th Overall Vuelta a Andalucía
 7th Trofeo Serra de Tramuntana
 9th Overall Tour de San Luis
2015
 2nd Overall Tour de Pologne
1st Stage 5 
2016
 2nd Overall Tour de l'Ain
1st  Mountains classification

Grand Tour general classification results timeline

References

External links

Bart De Clercq profile at Omega Pharma-Lotto

1986 births
Living people
People from Zottegem
Belgian male cyclists
Belgian Giro d'Italia stage winners
Cyclists from East Flanders
European Games competitors for Belgium
Cyclists at the 2015 European Games